The 2020 Campeonato Pernambucano da Série A1 (officially the Campeonato Pernambucano estadium.bet 2020 for sponsorship reasons) was the 106th edition of the state championship of Pernambuco organized by FPF. The championship began on 18 January and ended on 5 August.

On 14 March 2020, FPF announced that all the matches of Campeonato Pernambucano would be played behind closed doors to prevent the spread of the coronavirus COVID-19. Consequently, the match Santa Cruz v Decisão played on 15 March 2020 was played behind closed doors. On 16 March 2020, FPF announced the suspension of the tournament.  Complying with the guidelines of the Governo do Estado de Pernambuco, the tournament resumed behind closed doors on 19 July 2020.

Sport were the defending champions, but were eliminated in the first stage.

The finals were contested in two-legged home-and-away format between Salgueiro and Santa Cruz. Tied 1–1 on aggregate, Salgueiro won 4–3 on penalties, winning the tournament for the first time in their history. As champions, Salgueiro qualified for the 2021 Copa do Brasil and 2021 Copa do Nordeste.

Santa Cruz and Retrô qualified for 2021 Copa do Brasil as runners-up and best placed team in the first stage not already qualified, respectively.

Sport (best team in the 2020 RNC) qualified for the 2021 Copa do Nordeste. Santa Cruz qualified for the 2021 Pré-Copa do Nordeste via RNC.

Teams

Ten teams were competing, eight returning from the 2019 and two promoted from the 2019 Pernambucano A2 Championship: Decisão and Retrô.

Following the COVID protocol proposed by FPF, after the suspension due to the pandemic, all the matches would be played at Arena Pernambuco. However the second semi-final, Salgueiro v Afogados, was player at Cornélio de Barros and the finals between Salgueiro and Santa Cruz were played at Cornélio de Barros and Arruda.

Schedule
The schedule of the competition was as follows.

First stage
In the first stage, each team played the other nine teams in a single round-robin tournament. The teams were ranked according to points (3 points for a win, 1 point for a draw, and 0 points for a loss). If tied on points, the following criteria would be used to determine the ranking: 1. Wins; 2. Goal difference; 3. Goals scored; 4. Fewest red cards; 5. Fewest yellow cards; 6. Draw in the headquarters of the FPF.

Top two teams advanced to the semi-finals of the final stages, while teams from third to sixth places advanced to the quarter-finals. The four teams with the lowest number of points played a relegation stage.

Best team not qualified for the finals qualified for 2021 Copa do Brasil. Top two teams not already qualified for 2021 Série A, Série B or Série C qualified for 2021 Série D.

Standings

Results

Relegation stage
In the relegation stage each team played the other three teams in a single round-robin tournament. The two teams with the lowest number of points were relegated to the 2021 Campeonato Pernambucano A2. The teams were ranked according to points (3 points for a win, 1 point for a draw, and 0 points for a loss). If tied on points, the following criteria would be used to determine the ranking: 1. Wins; 2. Goal difference; 3. Goals scored; 4. Fewest red cards; 5. Fewest yellow cards; 6. Draw in the headquarters of the FPF.

Standings and Results

Final stages
Starting from the quarter-finals, the teams played a single-elimination tournament with the following rules:
Quarter-finals and semi-finals were played on a single-leg basis, with the higher-seeded team hosting the leg.
 If tied, the penalty shoot-out would be used to determine the winner.
Finals were played on a home-and-away two-legged basis, with the higher-seeded team hosting the second leg.
 If tied on aggregate, the penalty shoot-out would be used to determine the winner.
Extra time would not be played and away goals rule would not be used in final stages.
Third place match was not played.

Bracket

Quarter-finals

|}

Matches

Semi-finals

|}

Matches

Santa Cruz qualified for the 2021 Copa do Brasil.

Salgueiro qualified for the 2021 Copa do Brasil.

Finals

|}

Matches

Salgueiro qualified for the 2021 Copa do Nordeste.

Top goalscorers

2020 Campeonato Pernambucano team
The 2020 Campeonato Pernambucano team was a squad consisting of the eleven most impressive players at the tournament.

References

Campeonato Pernambucano seasons
Pernambucano
Campeonato Pernambucano